Almo Sounds was a record label which was started in 1994 by Herb Alpert and Jerry Moss after they sold A&M Records to PolyGram. The intent for the label was to recreate the initial concept of A&M Records as a small, "boutique" label.

The label signed artists Gillian Welch, Imogen Heap, Ozomatli and Garbage and several other artists.  Psychic TV did demos that were rejected for the label. Herb Alpert himself released his "Second Wind", "Passion Dance", and "Colours" albums on the label.

A Nashville division was launched in 1995. Headed by record producer Garth Fundis, it released albums by Paul Jefferson, Billy Yates, and Bekka & Billy.

The label has not released new product since 1999 and in 2000 is was sold to Universal Music Group. Commercially viable catalog albums remain available through Interscope Records, a current sister label to A&M.

Discography

Albums

EPs

See also 
 List of record labels

References

External links
 ALMO Sounds History https://www.onamrecords.com/labels/almo-sounds

American record labels
Record labels established in 1994
Record labels disestablished in 2000
Indie rock record labels
1994 establishments in the United States